This is a list of notable Nonprofit Organizations, Charitable Organisations and Non-Governmental Organisations (NGOs) working in India or connected with Indian diaspora.

See also
Non-governmental organisations in India
Nonprofit organization
List of think tanks in India

References

Organisations based in India
India